The 2002 U.S. Figure Skating Championships took place between January 6 and 13, 2002 in Los Angeles, California. Medals were awarded in four colors: gold (first), silver (second), bronze (third), and pewter (fourth) in four disciplines – men's singles, ladies' singles, pair skating, and ice dancing – across three levels: senior, junior, and novice.

The event determined the U.S. teams for the 2002 Winter Olympics, 2002 World Championships, 2002 Four Continents Championships, and 2002 World Junior Championships.

Competition notes
 There was a tie in the senior men's short program between Eldredge and Goebel. Both received four first place marks, three seconds and two thirds.
 Although placing second, senior ice dancers Tanith Belbin / Benjamin Agosto were not placed on the Olympic team due to citizenship problems. Third place finishers Melissa Gregory / Denis Petukov, who would under normal circumstances been the first alternates, also were ineligible due to citizenship problems. Fourth place finishers Beata Handra / Charles Sinek were therefore the second entry to the Olympic team. It was their first World level competition.
 The senior compulsory dances were the Ravensburger Waltz and the Blues. The junior compulsory dances were the Viennese Waltz and the Quickstep. The novice compulsory dances were the Tango and the Paso Doble.

Senior results

Men

Ladies

Pairs

Ice dancing

Junior results

Men

Ladies

Pairs

Ice dancing

Novice results

Men

Ladies

Pairs

Ice dancing

External links

 2002 State Farm U.S. Figure Skating Championships

U.S. Figure Skating Championships
United States Figure Skating Championships, 2002
United States Figure Skating Championships, 2002
January 2002 sports events in the United States